Rahart Adams (born 1 February 1996) is an Australian actor. After first appearing in commercials and a guest role in Neighbours, he played a lead in Nowhere Boys and then joined the cast of Every Witch Way. Other major roles include Nickelodeon's 2015 comedy Liar, Liar, Vampire, 2016's Emo the Musical,  Star Light in 2020 and the YouTube Original series Foursome from season 2. Adams has a regular role in the upcoming TV series Gotham Knights, due in March 2023.

Filmography

Film

Television

References

External links
 

Living people
1990s births
Australian male film actors
Australian male television actors
Male actors from Melbourne